Alvester Alexander (born October 17, 1990) is an American football running back who is currently a free agent. He played college football at Wyoming.

Professional career 
On April 29, 2012, the Chicago Bears signed Alexander as an undrafted free agent. On July 17, 2012, he was cut from the Bears roster.

On August 14, 2012, he signed with the Indianapolis Colts. But on December 11, 2012, he was cut.

On December 26, he signed with the Tennessee Titans.

On August 17, 2013, he signed with the Pittsburgh Steelers. He spent the entire 2013 season on their practice squad. At the end of the season the Steelers signed him to Reserve/Future Contract. He signed with the Ottawa Redblacks in 2015.

Alexander participated in The Spring League in 2017.

References

External links
Pittsburgh Steelers profile

American football running backs
Canadian football running backs
African-American players of American football
African-American players of Canadian football
1990 births
Living people
Wyoming Cowboys football players
Ottawa Redblacks players
The Spring League players
Chicago Bears players
Indianapolis Colts players
Tennessee Titans players
Pittsburgh Steelers players
Players of American football from Houston
Players of Canadian football from Houston
21st-century African-American sportspeople